Rudolph Friedrich Hohenacker (1798 – 14 November 1874) was a Swiss missionary and botanist born in Zürich.

In the 1820s he was assigned to the Swabian colony of Helenendorf in the Transcaucasus, where he served as a doctor and missionary. Eventually, his main focus involved collecting plants from the region. In 1841 he returned to Switzerland, where he took up residence in Basel. Shortly afterwards he relocated to Esslingen, Germany (1842-1858), and in 1858 moved to the town of Kirchheim unter Teck.

Following his return from the Transcaucasus, Hohenacker earned his living selling exsiccatae based on specimens of other collectors. He was the author of Enumeratio Plantarum quas in itinere per provinciam Talysch collegit.

In 1836 the botanical genus Hohenackeria (family Apiaceae) was named in his honor by Carl Anton von Meyer and Friedrich Ernst Ludwig von Fischer.

Hohenacker is commemorated in the scientific name of the Transcaucasian ratsnake, Zamenis hohenackeri.

References

External links
 Aluka, Hohenacker, Rudolph Friedrich (1798-1874)
 IPNI List of plants described and co-described by Hohenacker.

19th-century Swiss botanists
Scientists from Zürich
1798 births
1874 deaths